The Transpacific Stabilization Agreement (TSA) is a research and discussion forum used by 15 of the main container shipping lines which carry cargo between Asia and the United States. The agreement operates differently and has different membership for eastbound and westbound carriage. U.S. authorization falls under the oversight of the Federal Maritime Commission.

The members of the TSA (eastbound) and TSA (westbound, marked *) are:
APL Co. Pte Ltd. *
China Shipping Container Lines
CMA-CGM *
COSCO Container Lines, Ltd. *
Evergreen Line *
Hanjin Shipping Co., Ltd. *
Hapag-Lloyd AG *
Hyundai Merchant Marine Co., Ltd. *
Kawasaki Kisen Kaisha, Ltd. (K Line)
Maersk Line *
Mediterranean Shipping Co. *
Nippon Yusen Kaisha (N.Y.K. Line) *
Orient Overseas Container Line, Ltd. *
Yangming Marine Transport Corp. *
Zim Integrated Shipping Services. *

External sites
Eastbound: http://www.tsacarriers.org/
Westbound: http://tsa-westbound.org/home.html

References

Maritime transport
Sea lanes